St.Petersburg String Quartet (formed 1985) is a Russian string quartet. Their interpretations and recordings of Shostakovich, Tchaikovsky, Borodin, Prokofiev and Glazunov string quartets can be found on Sony, Melodiya, Hyperion, Delos, Dorian and Marquis labels.

Current members
Alla Aranovskaya - 1st violin 
Ned Kelleberger - 2nd violin
Boris Vayner - Viola
Sascha Groschang  -cello

References

External links
Official website
 Hear St. Petersburg String Quartet in concert  from WGBH Radio Boston

Russian string quartets